The Rally of Democratic Forces (RFD), or Assembly of Democratic Forces, is a political party in Mauritania. It is led by Ahmed Ould Daddah.

In October 2000, the Union of Democratic Forces-New Era, which was led by Daddah, was dissolved by the government for allegedly inciting violence and harming the country's interests. In its place the Rally of Democratic Forces was established, and Daddah was elected its president in January 2002.

In the parliamentary election held on October 19 and 26 October 2001, the party won 5.6% of the popular vote and 3 out of 81 seats.

Daddah declared the RFD to be "the country's biggest political force" after the first round of the 2006 Mauritanian parliamentary election, held on 19 November. The RFD participated in this election as part of an eight party opposition alliance. It won 15 out of 95 seats in the 21 January and 4 February 2007 Senate elections 7 out of 56 seats. In the 11 March and 25 March 2007 presidential election, Daddah, the party's candidate, won 20.69% in the first round, but was defeated in the second round with 47.15%.

Daddah said on May 7, 2008, that the RFD would not participate in the government of Prime Minister Yahya Ould Ahmed El Waghef, despite Waghef's consultations with opposition parties regarding the formation of a government.

The RFD supported the military coup d'état of August 6, 2008. Daddah described the coup as "a movement to rectify the democratic process" and alleged that the 2007 presidential election was "marked by fraud".

The RFD is an observer member of the Socialist International.

References

Full member parties of the Socialist International
Social democratic parties in Africa
Socialist parties in Mauritania